Irakleia or Heraklia is an island and a former community in the Cyclades, Greece. Since the 2011 local government reform it is part of the municipality Naxos and Lesser Cyclades, of which it is a municipal unit. Its population was officially 141 inhabitants at the 2011 census, and its land area . It is a small island between the islands of Naxos and Ios. Close to Schoinoussa, Koufonisi, Donoussa, and Keros, together they form the Lesser Cyclades. The port is called Agios Georgios, while the "capital"/chora on the top of the island is called Panagia (Madonna). The biggest caves in the Cyclades are located on Irakleia. Irakleia can be reached by ferries from Athens, Naxos and Paros.

Description
Iraklia is the largest island of the Lesser Cyclades. It is located in the eastern part of the archipelago, which is south of Naxos. The island has two settlements, Panagia in the middle of the island and Agios Georgios, where the port is located. Irakleia has been inhabited from early antiquity. On the island there are many mysterious rock paintings which are from approximately 5,000 years ago. The paintings, named Bousoules (Μπούσουλες), may have been used as orientation marks. The ruins of a fortress dating from the 4th-2nd century B.C. are located at Livadi on the island. In modern times, Iraklia was the property of the Hozoviotissa Monastery on the nearby island of Amorgos.

Historical population

References

External links
Official website 

Ports and harbours of Greece
Lesser Cyclades
Islands of Greece
Landforms of Naxos (regional unit)
Islands of the South Aegean
Populated places in Naxos (regional unit)